Carolina Amesty is an American politician serving as a member of the Florida House of Representatives for the 45th district. She assumed office on November 8, 2022.

Education 
Amesty earned an Associate of Arts degree from the Seminole State College of Florida and a Bachelor of Arts degree in political science and government from University of Central Florida.

Career 
In 2014 and 2015, Amesty worked as the director of academic affairs at Central Christian University. Amesty returned to Central Christian University in 2017, working as senior advisor to the president and executive vice president.

Florida House of Representatives 
Amesty successfully ran for a seat in the Florida House of Representatives in the 2022 election. Her candidacy was endorsed by Donald Trump Jr.

Personal life 
Amesty is a Christian.

References 

Living people
Republican Party members of the Florida House of Representatives
Women state legislators in Florida
Hispanic and Latino American state legislators in Florida
American politicians of Cuban descent
Christians from Florida
Seminole State College of Florida alumni
University of Central Florida alumni
21st-century American politicians
21st-century American women politicians
Year of birth missing (living people)